Vethalan Kavu Mahadeva Temple is located at Krishnapuram near Kayamkulam in Alappuzha District, Kerala. It is one of the rarest temples in the world where Lord Siva is worshiped as Vethala. It is about 3 km East of famous Oachira Parabrahma temple.

Important festivals

 Festival is celebrated on the last Friday of Malayalam month Makaram (in February).
 Sivarathri
 Vishu

See also

 Temples of Kerala
 Temple festivals of Kerala

References

 Reg. No A. 282/2003

Hindu temples in Alappuzha district
Shiva temples in Kerala